The 1983–84 Alcorn State Braves basketball team represented Alcorn State University during the 1983–84 NCAA Division I men's basketball season. The Braves, led by head coach Davey Whitney, played their home games at the Davey Whitney Complex and were members of the Southwestern Athletic Conference. They finished the season 21–10, 11–3 in SWAC play to win the conference regular season. They also won the SWAC tournament to receive an automatic bid to the NCAA tournament as one of two No. 12 seeds in the Midwest region. The Braves defeated Houston Baptist 79–60, and then pushed No. 5 seed Kansas to the brink before falling, 57–56.

Roster

Schedule and results

|-
!colspan=9 style=| Regular season

|-
!colspan=9 style=| SWAC tournament

|-
!colspan=9 style=| NCAA tournament

References

Alcorn State Braves basketball seasons
Alcorn State
Alcorn State